Joseph Lonsway (March 17, 1844 – January 22, 1925) was a Private in the Union Army and a Medal of Honor recipient for his actions in the American Civil War.

Lonsway enlisted in the Army from Sackett's Harbor, New York in October 1863, and mustered out with his regiment in July 1865.

Medal of Honor citation
Rank and organization: Private, Company D, 20th New York Cavalry. Place and date: At Murfrees Station, Va., October 16, 1864. Entered service at:------. Birth: Clayton, N.Y. Date of issue: Unknown.

Citation:

Volunteered to swim Blackwater River to get a large flat used as a ferry on other side; succeeded in getting the boat safely across, making it possible for a detachment to cross the river and take possession of the enemy's breastworks.

See also

List of Medal of Honor recipients
List of American Civil War Medal of Honor recipients: G–L

References

External links

1844 births
1925 deaths
United States Army Medal of Honor recipients
United States Army soldiers
People from Clayton, New York
People of New York (state) in the American Civil War
American Civil War recipients of the Medal of Honor